Monoloxis is a genus of snout moths. It was described by George Hampson in 1897.

Species
 Monoloxis cinerascens (Warren, 1891)
 Monoloxis flavicinctalis (Sepp, 1852)
 Monoloxis graphitalis (C. Felder, R. Felder & Rogenhofer, 1875)

References

Chrysauginae
Pyralidae genera